Paulo Henrique Rodrigues Cabral (born 23 October 1996), simply Paulo Henrique, is a Portuguese footballer who plays for Santa Clara as a defender.

Football career
Born in Fenais da Luz, a civil parish of Ponta Delgada in the Azores, Paulo Henrique came through the youth ranks of local team Santa Clara. On 27 July 2013, he made his professional debut in a 2013–14 Taça da Liga match against Farense, when he started and played the full game. He played six Segunda Liga games over the season and scored the only goal of a home win over Sporting CP B on 29 January 2014.

On 3 July 2015, Paulo Henrique signed a four-year deal with Primeira Liga club Paços de Ferreira. He made two league appearances in his first season and scored on the latter, a 4–3 win at União da Madeira on 17 April 2016. After making no more appearances, he moved to Sporting da Covilhã in the second division on a season's loan on 17 August 2017.

Having made just three appearances as Paços won the second division title in 2018–19, Paulo Henrique's contract with the Castores expired and he signed a one-year deal with Penafiel in that league.

In June 2021, Paulo Henrique returned to Santa Clara on a three-year deal, with the team now in the top flight.

References

External links

Stats and profile at LPFP 
National team data 

1996 births
Living people
People from Ponta Delgada
Portuguese footballers
Association football defenders
Primeira Liga players
Liga Portugal 2 players
C.D. Santa Clara players
F.C. Paços de Ferreira players
S.C. Covilhã players
F.C. Penafiel players
Portugal youth international footballers
Footballers at the 2016 Summer Olympics
Olympic footballers of Portugal